Kepler-68d is a gas giant with the minimum mass about the same as Jupiter. It is at least a jovian-mass planet orbiting 1.4 astronomical units from its parent star, Kepler-68, well within habitable zone of the star. It was detected by radial velocity. 

After planets Kepler-68b and c were detected by observing planetary transits in front of its star, doppler spectroscopy measurements were used to make follow-up observations of the star. Kepler-68d was discovered using that method.

References

External links
 Table of confirmed planets at NASA, Kepler mission

68d
Exoplanets discovered in 2013
Giant planets in the habitable zone
Cygnus (constellation)